Luca Savelli was a Roman senator who in 1234 sacked the Lateran.  He was born in 1190, died in 1266, and was married to Vana Aldobrandeschi.  Luca's tomb is found at the Santa Maria in Aracoeli "Our Lady of The Heavenly Altar", along with his wife, and his son Giacomo (Honorius IV).  The papal tomb was actually designed for Luca's wife Vana. Another son, Pandolfo, was the podestà of Viterbo (1275).

Ancient Roman senators
1190 births
1266 deaths